Siti Masitha Soeparno is an Indonesian businesswoman and politician. She served as the mayor of Tegal in Central Java from 2014 to 2017.

On the evening of Tuesday, 29 August 2017, Soeparno was arrested on graft charges by the Corruption Eradication Commission (KPK), leading to her removal from office. Central Java Governor Ganjar Pranowo referred to her arrest as a heavy blow to the entire province and called for a meeting of all mayors as a warning. Soeparno was arrested during a city council meeting at her official residence at the city hall complex. The Commission sealed the Kardinah Regional General Hospital just before the arrest, and the charges were allegedly related to Soeparno's approval of a new ICU built at the hospital. Her arrest occurred during a nationwide sweep of ten local officials by the Commission between July and September 2017.

Soeparno's predecessor, Ikmal Jaya, was also removed from office by the KPK due to corruption, meaning two consecutive mayors of Tegal have been removed on graft charges.

References

1964 births
Golkar politicians
Indonesian politicians convicted of corruption
Women mayors of places in Indonesia
Living people
Politicians from Jakarta
Mayors and regents of places in Central Java
People from Tegal
Mayors of places in Indonesia